Thorkelson is a surname. Notable people with the surname include:

Jacob Thorkelson (1876–1945), Norwegian-born American politician
Peter Thorkelson (1942–2019), American musician, composer, and actor
Scott Thorkelson (1958–2007), Canadian politician